Hot Country Songs is a chart that ranks the top-performing country music songs in the United States, published by Billboard magazine.  In 1977, 31 different singles topped the chart, which was at the time published under the title Hot Country Singles, based on playlists submitted by country music radio stations and sales reports submitted by stores.

Waylon Jennings spent the most weeks at number one, with eight, including a run of six weeks at the top with "Luckenbach, Texas (Back to the Basics of Love)"; no single since 1967 had spent longer at number one.  Crystal Gayle and Dolly Parton came closest to Jennings's total number of weeks at number one, each spending five weeks in the top spot.  Parton's time at number one comprised a five-week run with "Here You Come Again", the second-longest running chart-topper of 1977, in the issues of Billboard dated December 3 through December 31.  Conway Twitty was the only artist to take three different songs to the top of the chart.  Thanks to the prevalence of crossover-friendly country pop, several country number ones of 1977 also charted highly on Billboards all-genres singles chart, the Hot 100, including Glen Campbell's "Southern Nights", which reached number one on the Hot 100 in the issue of Billboard dated April 30, the second time that Campbell had taken a song to the top of both charts.  Crystal Gayle's "Don't It Make My Brown Eyes Blue" reached number 2 on the Hot 100 and Dolly Parton's "Here You Come Again" made number 3.

In February, Welsh singer Tom Jones achieved his first country number one with "Say You'll Stay Until Tomorrow".  Previously associated mainly with the pop music field, albeit with some forays into country, Jones focused on the country music market when he returned to recording in the mid 1970s after concentrating in the early part of the decade on live stage shows in Las Vegas.  He immediately topped the Hot Country chart with his very first entry and would achieve several more country hits over the next decade before moving back into the pop market.  Father-daughter duo The Kendalls also topped the chart for the first time in 1977, spending four weeks atop the listing with "Heaven's Just a Sin Away"; although they had entered the chart several times previously, none of their earlier hits had even reached the top 50.  Tammy Wynette, one of country music's best-known artists and biggest-selling female singers, topped the singles chart for the last time with "Near You", a duet with her former husband George Jones.  The couple had divorced in 1975, but continued to release records together.  Elvis Presley, the "king of rock 'n roll", topped the country chart with the last single released in his lifetime, when "Way Down" moved up to number one in the issue of Billboard dated August 20, four days after his death.

Chart history

See also
1977 in music
List of artists who reached number one on the U.S. country chart

Notes

References

1977
1977 record charts
Country